Anna Cinzia Bonfrisco (born 12 October 1962 in Riva del Garda) is an Italian politician.

In the 2006 general election she was elected senator on the Forza Italia list. She was re-elected in the 2008 and 2013 general elections.

On 3 June 2015 she left Forza Italia to join the Conservatives and Reformists party, of which she became the group leader in the Senate. In December 2016 she abandoned CoR and officially enrolled in the Italian Liberal Party. In 2018 she was elected Senator for the fourth time, on the League list.

In 2019 she was elected as a member of the European Parliament in 2019.

References

1962 births
Living people
MEPs for Italy 2019–2024
21st-century women MEPs for Italy
Lega Nord MEPs
Italian Liberal Party (1997) politicians
Conservatives and Reformists (Italy) politicians
The People of Freedom politicians
Forza Italia politicians
Senators of Legislature XV of Italy
Senators of Legislature XVI of Italy
Senators of Legislature XVII of Italy
Senators of Legislature XVIII of Italy
Forza Italia (2013) senators
Women members of the Senate of the Republic (Italy)